Club Deportivo Huracán are a Salvadoran professional football club based in Atiquizaya, El Salvador.

The club currently plays in the Tercera Division de Fútbol Salvadoreño.

Honours

Domestic honours
 Segunda División Salvadorean and predecessors 
 Champions (1) : TBD
 Tercera División Salvadorean and predecessors 
 Champions:(1) : TBD

Coaches
 Carlos Recinos
 Rubén Guevara
 Henry Rojas (2013–2014)

Football clubs in El Salvador